Doreen Meier (born 9 November 1968) is a German former footballer and manager who played as a forward, appearing for the East Germany women's national team in their first and only match on 9 May 1990.

Personal life
Meier was born in Gera, East Germany and was raised in Hermsdorf. She received her teaching degree for sports and history in Jena, and works as a teacher in a Cologne school.

Career statistics

International

References

External links
 
 Player profile at soccerdonna.de
 Manager profile at soccerdonna.de

1968 births
Living people
Sportspeople from Gera
Footballers from Thuringia
People from Bezirk Gera
German women's footballers
East German women's footballers
East Germany women's international footballers
Women's association football forwards
FF USV Jena players